Peruvian Argentines are Argentine citizens of partial or full Peruvian descent, or Peruvian citizens who have migrated to and settled in Argentina. 

According to the 2010 national census, there were 157,514 Peruvians living in Argentina, making them one of the largest immigrant communities in the country; many more are descended from Peruvians but were born in Argentina, thus counting as full Argentine citizens. Argentina is home to the fourth largest Peruvian community worldwide, after the United States, Spain and Chile.

History
The Peruvian-born population of Argentina has grown considerably since the 1980s. The 1980 national census registered 8,561 Peruvian-born residents in the country; that number had grown to 15,939 in 1991. The 2001 census registered 88,260 Peruvian-born residents, making up 5.8% of Argentina's immigrants and making them the seventh largest immigrant community in the country, behind Bolivians, Paraguayans, Chileans, Italians, Spaniards and Uruguayans. The following decade's national census registered another considerable jump, with 157,514 Peruvian-born residents in Argentina.

On 17 April 2006, President Néstor Kirchner launched the "Patria Grande" plan, an initiative to grant legal resident status to immigrants from Mercosur member states (including observer states such as Peru) with an irregular migration status. The policy was continued by Kirchner's successor, President Cristina Fernández de Kirchner. By 2010, of the 423,697 migrants registered in the programme, 47,455 were Peruvian-born.

Since 2007, the Peruvian Embassy in Argentina and the Buenos Aires City government have organised the yearly PerúBA festival, wherein members of the Peruvian community celebrate and share their cultural heritage, with shows of music, dance and food.

Territorial distribution

Peruvian-born residents and their descendants have primarily settled in large urban centers such as those of the Greater Buenos Aires conurbation, Córdoba, and Rosario. In Buenos Aires, the neighbourhoods of Balvanera and San Telmo are known for their considerable Peruvian communities.

The 2010 national census yielded the following results for the geographical distribution of Peruvian-born people living in Argentina:

Notable people
Gonzalo Aguirre (born 2003), footballer
Ignacio Álvarez Thomas (1787–1857), Independence-era military commander and politician
Catriel Cabellos (born 2004), footballer
Enrique Carreras (1925–1995), film director
Teófilo Castillo (1857–1922), painter
Carolina Freyre (1844–1916), poet and novelist
Helba Huara (1900–1986), dancer
Carlos Huntley-Robertson (1908–1982), rugby union player
Hugo Guerrero Marthineitz (1924–2010), journalist
Clorinda Matto de Turner (1852–1909), writer
Benjamín Ubierna (born 1991), footballer

See also

Argentina–Peru relations
Immigration to Argentina
Bolivian Argentines

References

Immigration to Argentina
Peruvian diaspora
+